Longstreet is an American police procedural that was broadcast on the ABC in the 1971–1972 season (see 1971 in television). A 90-minute pilot movie of the same name aired prior to the debut of the series as an ABC Movie of the Week.

Synopsis
The series starred James Franciscus as insurance investigator Mike Longstreet. After a bomb (hidden in a champagne bottle) kills his wife, Ingrid, and leaves him blind, the title character pursues and captures the killers. He then continues his career as an insurance investigator despite his blindness. Longstreet's seeing eye dog was a white German Shepherd called Pax. The series was set in New Orleans, but was actually filmed in Los Angeles.

Mystery fiction novelist Baynard Kendrick was credited in each episode as the creator of the source material for the series, although his character, Captain Duncan Maclain, had little in common with Longstreet aside from their both being blind private detectives.

Bruce Lee appeared in four episodes as Li Tsung, an antiques dealer and Jeet Kune Do expert who becomes Longstreet's martial arts instructor. Wikiquote has quotations from Li Tsung's teachings.

Twenty-three episodes of the show were aired before it was canceled in 1972.

Regular and recurring characters
 Mike Longstreet - James Franciscus 
 Nikki Bell - Marlyn Mason 22 episodes
 Duke Paige - Peter Mark Richman 20 episodes
 Mrs. Kingston - Ann Doran 17 episodes
 Li Tsung - Bruce Lee 4 episodes

Episodes

Pilot (1971)

Season 1 (1971–72)

Syndication
The series has rarely been re-aired, but appeared on Canadian TV channel Mystery TV in 2005–2006.

Home media
The series was released on a Region 2 DVD in Japan in late 2007.

On December 1, 2017, Visual Entertainment released Longstreet- The Complete Series on DVD in Region 1.

References

External links

  
  
 Longstreet fan website at Google.com

1971 American television series debuts
1972 American television series endings
American Broadcasting Company original programming
1970s American crime drama television series
Television series by CBS Studios
Television shows set in New Orleans